Tony Graham is a former competitive swimmer from New Zealand.

At the 1966 British Empire and Commonwealth Games in Kingston, Jamaica, he won two silver medals for his second-place finishes in the men's breaststroke swimming events: the first in the men's 110-yard breaststroke, and the second in the 220-yard breaststroke.  In addition he won a bronze medal competing as a member of New Zealand's third-place team in the men's 440-yard medley relay.

See also
 List of Commonwealth Games medallists in swimming (men)

References

Living people
Commonwealth Games bronze medallists for New Zealand
Commonwealth Games silver medallists for New Zealand
New Zealand male breaststroke swimmers
Swimmers at the 1966 British Empire and Commonwealth Games
Commonwealth Games medallists in swimming
Year of birth missing (living people)
20th-century New Zealand people
Medallists at the 1966 British Empire and Commonwealth Games